Navni Parihar is an Indian film and television actress. She made her debut with the TV serial Mujrim Haazir as the main lead alongside Nutan and Utpal Dutt. In the 90s, she was one of the most sought after top lead actresses of television. Her first commercial film was Hulchul opposite Vinod Khanna, and starring Ajay Devgan and Kajol. Her career spans over three decades across various genres and formats. During her career she has worked with multiple actors such as Irffan Khan, Om Puri, Anupam Kher, Akshay Kumar, Jugal Hansraj, Priyanka Chopra, Lara Dutta, Kareena Kapoor, Abhishek Bachchan, Vidya Balan, Salman Khan, Nawazuddin Siddiqui, Kartik Aryan, and Bhumi Pednekar. Subsequently, she has won many awards for her work. 

Navni is best known for her work in projects such as Dastaan, Daayre, Pradhanmantri, Tanu Weds Manu, Pati Patni Aur Woh, and Motichoor Chaknachoor. She has had the opportunity to work with directors such as Gulzar, Anand L. Rai, Madhur Bhandarkar, Rajshree Production, Anees Bazmee, Tigmanshu Dhulia, Suneel Darshan, Mahesh Bhatt, and Raj Kawar.

In addition to Hindi TV and movie industry, she has also starred in a few regional films (Lagyo Kasumbi No Rang, Partu) and in a German film, Wer Liebe verspricht (2008). Recently, her work can be seen in web series such as Little Things alongside Mithila Palkar on Netflix, and short films such as The Wallet alongside Naseeruddin Shah. Her upcoming projects include Salt City alongside Gauhar Khan and Piyush Mishra, Bhuj starring Ajay Devgan, Sonakshi Sinha, Sanjay Dutt, and Norah Fatehi, and Justice Delivered alongside Amol Palkar.

Early life 
Born Navni Chauhan in a traditional Rajput family to her parents - Dileep Singh and B. Rajlaxmi Singh, she grew up with her 5 sisters in Indore, M.P. 

After her B.Sc she did her MSW from Indore School of Social Work with a specialisation in medical and psychiatric social work. During her college fieldwork she worked extensively with the deaf, mute, and blind children, giving them dance, drama and painting lessons. These children won many awards under her guidance. Navni says this was her most satisfying phase. 

Navni started working in the film and television industry only after her marriage.

Personal life 
Navni is married to Animesh Parihar, who works in the global delivery and consultancy industry and has headed companies such as Capgemini, Oracle, and SAP and is a well known name in the IT industry. They have two daughters, Nibha Parihar and Sushmeena Parihar. Nibha did her education from Rajhans Vidyalaya, attended Sophia College, and then did her post-graduate studies from Manchester University, followed by MBA from Ross Business School. Sushmeena (born 1998) attended Oberoi International School, went to Lake Forest College, and is currently doing her post-graduation at New York University. Her younger one, Sushmeena, has expressed some interest in entering the entertainment industry and has been offered a few roles, but has largely stayed away from the camera till now.

Career and filmography

Film and short films
 Aranyaka (1994)
 Hulchul (1995)
 Ghatak (1996)
 Papa Kehte Hai (1996)
Tulsidas
Veer Savarkar (2001)
 Tum Se Achcha Kaun Hai (2002)
 Shararat (2002)
 Zindagi Khoobsoorat Hai (2002)
 Hum Pyar Tumhi Se Kar Baithe (2002)
 Andaaz (2003)
 Haasil (2003)
 Dil Pardesi Ho Gayaa (2003)
 Page 3 (2006)
 Lucky: No Time for Love (2005)
Chehraa (2005)
Shabnam Mousi (2005)
 Dosti: Friends Forever (2005)
 Corporate (2006)
 Naksha (2006)
 Good Boy Bad Boy as Mrs. Prem Malhotra (2007)
Panga Naa Lo (2007)
Rebecca Ryman: Wer Liebe verspricht (Rebecca Ryman: Olivia and Jai) (German film; 2008)
 Jail (2009)
 Tanu Weds Manu (2011)
 Staying Alive (2012)
Rabba Main Kya Karoon (2013)
Lagyo Kasumbi No Rang (Gujarati regional film; 2013)
 Jigariya (2014) 
 Tanu Weds Manu: Returns (2015)
Partu (Marathi regional film; 2015)
 Shaadi Mein Zaroor Aana (2017)
Lalai Ki Shaadi Mein Laaddoo Deewana (2017)
Love U Family (2017)
Dil Jo Na Keh Saka (2017) 
 Shinaakht as Razia (short film) (2018)
Phooljhadi (2018)
Khilaaf] (2019)
Amway Mother (2019)
When Your In-laws Become Your Family (2019)
 Pati Patni Aur Woh (2019)
 Motichoor Chaknachoor (2019)
Nokk Jhok - a lockdown film (2020)
The Wallet (2019)
Bhuj: The Pride of India (2021)
Justice Delivered (upcoming)

Television and web series
 Mujrim Hazir 
 Upasana 
 Mujrim Hazir
Kanoon
Tehkikaat-  A ghost of John Perrira (Episode no 48,49,50) - Mrs Madhu Chawla
 Chahat aur Nafrat
Aahat 
 Waqt Ki Raftar
 Sansaar 
 Manshaa as Asha Kishore Khanna; Vijay and Vinay's Mother
Tehreer, Munshi Prem Chand Ki 
Bani Ishq Da Kalma
 Kalakaar
Awaz -Dil Se Dil Tak
Arzoo
Reporter 
 Naya Daur
 Daayre
 Babul Ka Aangann Chootey Na 
 Pradhanmantri as Indira Gandhi
 7 RCR (TV Series) as Indira Gandhi
 Dastaan (Zee) 
 Badii Devrani 
Little Things (Season 2, Season 3) 
Salt City  (2022)

Ad fIlms 
 Waah Taj (alongside Zakir Hussain)
 Reynold's Bold 
Wheel 
Surf 
Ujjala 
Kinder Joy
Pepsodent
Body Revival tonic
Ratthi Milk Powder (Sri Lanka)
Huggies
Nature Fresh Oil 
Dawn Bread (Pakistan) 
Nerolac Paint 
LG Hing 
Amazon
Swarovski

Family lineage 
Navni was born into a traditional Rajput family which has links to the royal lineage. 

Navni’s maternal grandfather is from the Jung Bahadur Rana family of Nepal, and maternal grandmother is from DebBurman family of Tripura. Navni’s maternal great grandmother was Maharaj Kumari Kumudini Devi, and great-great grandmother was Maharani Manmohini Devi. Navni’s maternal great-great grandfather, Radhamohan Thakur Deb Barma, wrote the grammar of Kokborok named "Kok-Borokma" published in 1900 AD. Legendary music director S. D. Burman was 2nd cousin of Navni’s maternal grandmother Pratibhamoyi Devi Deb Burman. 

Navni’s mother-in-law was the daughter of Dheerpura princess Udaya Kumari, and father-in-law Ishwar Singh Parihar was the Director Publicity and Tourism, M.P. He was a very well known journalist, freedom fighter, and an author who wrote “Heart of India” which was converted into a dance-drama and inaugurated by then Prime Minister Pdt Jawaharlal Nehru.

See also
Parihar

References

External links
 
 

1966 births
Living people
Indian television actresses
Indian voice actresses
Actresses in Hindi cinema
Actresses from Indore
Indian film actresses
Actresses in Hindi television
20th-century Indian actresses
21st-century Indian actresses